Thomas Walter Laqueur (born September 6, 1945) is an American historian, sexologist and writer. He is the author of Solitary Sex: A Cultural History of Masturbation and Making Sex: Body and Gender from the Greeks to Freud as well as many articles and reviews. He is the winner of the Andrew W. Mellon Foundation's 2007 Distinguished Achievement Award, and is currently the Helen Fawcett Distinguished Professor of History at the University of California, Berkeley, located in Berkeley, California. Laqueur was elected to the American Philosophical Society in 2015.

Thought

One-sex model
Laqueur wrote that there was an ancient "one-sex model", in which the woman was only described as imperfect man / human and he postulates that definitions of sex/gender were historically different and changeable.

This argument has been challenged by some historians of science, notably Katharine Park and Robert A. Nye; Monica Green, Heinz-Jürgen Voss, and Helen King, who reject the suggestion that ancient descriptions show a homogenous model, the one-sex model which then mutated in the 18th century to a two-sex model. They encourage a more differentiated perception that makes clear that gender theories of natural philosophy as well as biology and medicine, are embedded and constructed in certain social contexts.

Bibliography

Books

Selected articles

 "The Queen Caroline Affair: Politics as Art in the Reign of George IV," The Journal of Modern History Vol. 54, No. 3, September 1982

See also

 List of non-fiction writers

  List of University of California, Berkeley faculty

References

External links
 University of California, Berkeley Department of History Faculty: Thomas W. Laqueur

 

1945 births
20th-century scholars
21st-century scholars
American sexologists
21st-century American historians
21st-century American male writers

Living people
University of California, Berkeley College of Letters and Science faculty
Writers from California
Swarthmore College alumni
Princeton University alumni
Rockefeller Fellows
Historians from California
American male non-fiction writers